Hussein Sheikh Ahmed Kaddare (March 2 1934 – February 2015) was a Somali inventor, linguist, and researcher in Somali traditions and folklore.  Kaddare contributed his linguistic expertise in Somalia's Ministry of information.

Kaddare is widely known for creating the Kaddare script used in transcribing the Somali language.

Biography
Kaddare was born in the town of Adale in the Middle Shebelle region of Somalia in 1934. In 1953, he created the Kaddare script, an orthography named after him that was used to transcribe the Somali language He died on February 1, 2015, in Mogadishu after battling an unspecified illness.

See also
 Kaddare script
 Osmanya script
 Borama script
 Wadaad's writing
 Osman Yusuf Kenadid
 Sheikh Abdurahman Sheikh Nuur

Notes

References

External links
 Somali Language History and Vernaculars
 The Gadabuursi Somali Script - qasidas in Gadabuursi/Borama

1934 births
2015 deaths
Ethnic Somali people
Somali inventors
Somalian writers
Somalian scholars
Creators of writing systems
Linguists from Somalia